The Financial Conduct Authority Handbook is a set of rules required to be followed by banks, insurers, investment businesses and other financial services in the United Kingdom under the Financial Services and Markets Act 2000. It is administered by the Financial Conduct Authority in London.

See also
UK company law
UK public service law
UK banking law
FCA Controlled Functions

External links
FCA Handbook online

United Kingdom banking law